A castle doctrine, also known as a castle law or a defense of habitation law, is a legal doctrine that designates a person's abode or any legally occupied place (for example, a vehicle or home) as a place in which that person has protections and immunities permitting one, in certain circumstances, to use force (up to and including deadly force) to defend oneself against an intruder, free from legal prosecution for the consequences of the force used. The term is most commonly used in the United States, though many other countries invoke comparable principles in their laws.

Depending on the location, a person may have a duty to retreat to avoid violence if one can reasonably do so. Castle doctrines lessen the duty to retreat when an individual is assaulted within one's own home. Deadly force may either be justified, the burdens of production and proof for charges impeded, or an affirmative defense against criminal homicide applicable, in cases "when the actor reasonably fears imminent peril of death or serious bodily harm to him or herself or another". The castle doctrine is not a defined law that can be invoked, but a set of principles which may be incorporated in some form in many jurisdictions. Castle doctrines may not provide civil immunity, such as from wrongful death suits, which have a much lower burden of proof.

Justifiable homicide in self-defense which happens to occur inside one's home is distinct, as a matter of law, from castle doctrine because the mere occurrence of trespassing—and occasionally a subjective requirement of fear—is sufficient to invoke the castle doctrine. The burden of proof of fact is much less challenging than that of justifying a homicide in self-defense. With justifiable homicide in self-defense, one generally must objectively prove to a trier of fact, against all reasonable doubt, the intent in the intruder's mind to commit violence or a felony. It would be a misconception of law to infer that because a state has a justifiable homicide in self-defense provision pertaining to one's domicile, it has a castle doctrine protecting the estate and exonerating any duty whatsoever to retreat therefrom. The doctrine can be misused as a pretext for extrajudicial punishment in private spaces. The use of this legal principle in the United States has been controversial in relation to a number of cases in which it has been invoked, including the deaths of Japanese exchange student Yoshihiro Hattori and Scottish businessman Andrew de Vries.

History
The legal concept of the inviolability of the home has been known in Western civilization since the age of the Roman Republic. In English common law the term is derived from the dictum that "an Englishman's home is his castle" (see Semayne's case). This concept was established as English law by the 17th century jurist Sir Edward Coke, in his The Institutes of the Laws of England, 1628:

The term 'castle' was defined in 1763 by Prime Minister William Pitt, 1st Earl of Chatham, "The poorest man may in his cottage bid defiance to all the forces of the crown. It may be frail – its roof may shake – the wind may blow through it – the storm may enter – the rain may enter – but the King of England cannot enter."

English common law came with colonists to the New World, where it has become known as the castle doctrine. The term has been used in England to imply a person's absolute right to exclude anyone from their home, although this has always had restrictions, such as bailiffs having increasing powers of entry since the late-20th century.

According to 18th-century Presbyterian minister and biblical commentator Matthew Henry, the prohibition of murder found in the Old Testament contains an exception for legitimate self-defense. A home defender who struck and killed a thief caught in the act of breaking in at night was not guilty of bloodshed. "If a thief is caught breaking in and is struck so that he dies, the thief owes no blood-debt to the home-defender; but if the thief lives, he owes a blood-debt to the home-defender and must make restitution."

In the early United States

By the 18th century, many US state legal systems began by importing English common law such as Acts of Parliament of 2 Ed. III (Statute of Northampton), and 5 Rich. II (Forcible Entry Act 1381) in law since 1381—which imposed criminal sanctions intending to discourage the resort to self-help. This required a threatened party to retreat, whenever property was "involved" and resolve the issue by civil means.

Then as now, there were English politicians who were for or against the use of self-help over state-help. William Blackstone, in Book 4, Chapter 16 of his Commentaries on the Laws of England, proclaims that the laws "leave him (the inhabitant) the natural right of killing the aggressor (the burglar)" and goes on to generalize in the following words:

Not only was the doctrine considered to justify defense against neighbors and criminals, but any of the Crown's agents who attempted to enter without a proper warrant as well. Prohibitions of the Fourth Amendment to the United States Constitution share a common background with current castle doctrine laws.

In 1841, The Preemption Act was passed to "appropriate the proceeds of the sales of public lands... and to grant 'pre-emption rights' to individuals" who were already living on federal lands (commonly referred to as "squatters"). During this same period, claim clubs sprung up all over the US advocating vigilance and the castle doctrine. This was in concurrence with the culture of manifest destiny which led to westward expansion and the American Indian Wars, the last of which ended by the 1920s.

On the American frontier
On the American frontier, the doctrine of no duty to retreat extended outside a residence. It asserted that a man in an altercation that he did not provoke was not obliged to flee from his attacker, but was free to stand his ground and defend himself. A state Supreme Court justice wrote in 1877,

American West historian Richard M. Brown wrote that under the circumstances, for a man in the American West to flee under such circumstances would be cowardly and un-American. 
Legendary dentist and gambler Doc Holliday successfully used this defense when he shot Billy Allen as he entered a saloon. Holliday owed Allen $5 which Allen wanted paid and had threatened Holliday. Although Allen was unarmed at the time, Holliday had received reports that Allen had been armed and looking for him earlier in the day. During the subsequent trial, Holliday asserted he was within his rights and the jury agreed. He was acquitted on March 28, 1885.

Current position

Today, the penal and civil forcible-entry laws of most American states forbid the use of force in the recovery of possession of land. At most the Castle Doctrine is an affirmative defense for individuals inevitably charged with criminal homicide, not a permission or pretext to commit homicide—which is generally unlawful. A minority of states permit individuals who have the right of immediate possession of land to use reasonable force to regain possession of that land, with Texas being the only state to allow the use of deadly force to regain possession of land or property.

The term "make my day law" came to be used in the United States in 1985 when Colorado passed a law that shielded people from any criminal or civil liability for using force against a home invader, including deadly force. (The law's nickname is a reference to the line "Go ahead, make my day" (meaning 'do something so I have an excuse to kill you') uttered by actor Clint Eastwood's character "Dirty Harry" Callahan in the 1983 police film Sudden Impact.)

Conditions of use

Each jurisdiction incorporates the castle doctrine into its laws in different ways. The circumstance in which it may be invoked include the premises covered (abode only, or other places too), the degree of retreat or non-deadly resistance required before deadly force can be used, etc. Typical conditions that apply to some castle doctrine laws include:
An intruder must be making (or have made) an attempt to unlawfully or forcibly enter an occupied residence, business, or vehicle.
The intruder must be acting unlawfully (the castle doctrine does not allow a right to use force against officers of the law, acting in the course of their legal duties).
The occupant(s) of the home must reasonably believe the intruder intends to inflict serious bodily harm or death upon an occupant of the home. Some states apply the Castle Doctrine if the occupant(s) of the home reasonably believe the intruder intends to commit a lesser felony such as arson or burglary.
The occupant(s) of the home must not have provoked or instigated an intrusion; or, provoked/instigated an intruder's threat or use of deadly force. In all cases, the occupant(s) of the home: must be there legally; must not be fugitives from the law themselves, or aiding/abetting other fugitives; and must not use force upon an officer of the law performing a legal duty.

In Colorado, the make-my-day statute provides the occupant with immunity from prosecution only for force used against a person who has made an unlawful entry into the dwelling, but not against a person who remains unlawfully in the dwelling.

Immunity from civil lawsuit
In addition to providing a valid defense in criminal law, many laws implementing the castle doctrine, particularly those with a "stand-your-ground clause," also have a clause which provides immunity from any civil lawsuits filed on behalf of the assailant (for damages/injuries resulting from the force used to stop them). Without this clause, an assailant could sue for medical bills, property damage, disability, and pain and suffering as a result of the injuries inflicted by the defender; or, if the force results in the assailant's death, their next-of-kin or estate could launch a wrongful death suit. Even if successfully rebutted, the defendant (the homeowner/defender) would still have to pay high legal costs leading up to the suit's dismissal. Without criminal/civil immunity, such civil action could be used as revenge against a lawfully acting defender (who was, originally, the assailant's victim).

Use of force in self-defense which causes damage or injuries to other, non-criminally-acting parties, may not be shielded from criminal or civil prosecution, however.

Duty to retreat
In US jurisdictions where the Castle Doctrine applies, there is no duty to retreat before deadly force is used against an intruder by a person in their home or, in some jurisdictions, just simply where the person can legally be.

Stand-your-ground

Most states in the United States have stand-your-ground laws where individuals can use deadly force in any location one is legally allowed to be without first attempting to retreat.

Culpability of intruder
In Colorado, the make-my-day statute "was not intended to justify use of physical force against persons who enter a dwelling accidentally or in good faith." In other words, "the unlawful entry element requires a culpable mental state of 'knowingly' on the part of the intruder."

State-by-state positions in the United States

A list of states and their most applicable body of law to justifying homicide in protection of the abode is listed below. Because not all states truly invoke castle doctrine, justifiable homicide in defense of life—which is nearly universal in adoption, but with narrower application—is often what is invoked as a pretext to protect the home. However, the mere fact that one is trespassing is an inappropriate or inadequate defense per se to justifying homicide in many states.

States incorporating castle doctrine principles
The castle doctrine in its traditional absolute and extrajudicial form is antiquated in most states. However, its vestige saliently remains as a set of principles which are incorporated to a variegated extent through both statutory and case law. It is commonly manifested as an affirmative defense to criminal homicide that occurred within a home; in some states though it slightly enhances the conditions for justifiable homicide in self-defense by laying down no duty to retreat or avert a violent encounter, or by even granting a blanket rebuttable presumption of required killing in defense of life. Where principles are statutized in a penal code, a homicide may be excused criminally, but be a wrongful death civilly. In a strict sense, simple justifiable homicide in self-defense which happens to occur inside one's home is actually distinct as a matter of law from castle doctrine's no duty to retreat in defense of one's domicile. Self-defense protects life while castle doctrine defends estate. While most American states forbid the use of force in the recovery of possession of land, a minority of jurisdictions do invoke pure castle doctrine which unconditionally authorizes violent self-help in protection of one's domicile.

States with weak or no specific castle law
These states uphold castle doctrine in general, but may rely on case law instead of specific legislation, may enforce a duty to retreat, and may impose specific restrictions on the use of deadly force:
District of Columbia
Nebraska - a bill was introduced in January 2012 that allowed deadly force against a person who broke into a house or occupied vehicle or who tried to kidnap someone from a house or vehicle; however, the bill was revised to include only an affirmative defense from lawsuits pertaining to justifiable use of force.
New Mexico - Limited Castle Doctrine for self-defense inside one's home established by court precedence in State v. Couch (1946). No civil immunity from potential lawsuits by the aggressor or surviving relatives. In 2011, two bills (House Bill 228 and Senate Bill 29) would have granted civil immunity to individuals who lawfully use lethal force in self-defense, both bills died in their respective chambers of the New Mexico Legislature.
Vermont

Situation in U.S. territories

Outside the United States

Australia
Australian states have differing self-defence laws. Under South Australian law, the general defence appears in s15(1) Criminal Law Consolidation Act 1935 (SA) for defending a person's life, and s15A(1) for defending property, subject to a hybrid test, i.e. the defendant honestly believed the threat to be imminent and made an objectively reasonable and proportionate response to the circumstances as the accused subjectively perceived them.

In July 2003, South Australia's Rann Government introduced laws allowing householders to use "whatever force they deem necessary" when confronted with a home invader. Householders who kill or injure a home invader escape prosecution provided they can prove they had a genuine belief that it was necessary to do so to protect themselves or their family. The law was strongly opposed by then-Director of Public Prosecutions Paul Rofe, QC, and lawyer Marie Shaw, who is now a District Court Judge.

In February 2019, Sydney man Bradley Soper was killed when he broke into the home of Francois Schwartz. After investigation, NSW Police detectives advised not to prosecute Schwartz.

Brazil
Since 1917, with the enacting of the first Brazilian Civil Code, a possessor of a thing, moveable or immoveable, is allowed, in case of disturbance ("turbação") or expulsion ("esbulho"), to "maintain or to reintegrate himself [at the possession of a thing] using its own force, as well as he does it soon". The acts of force employed by the possessor shall not exceed the necessary ones for eliminating the disturbance or for reintegration (Article 502 of the former Civil Code; Federal Ordinary Law 3.071/1917). This possibility remained untouched on the Brazilian Civil Code of 2002 (Federal Ordinary Law 10.406/2002), in its Article 1.210.

Self-defence of possession is not allowed for the cases of threat ("ameaça"). It is needed for the possessor to be effectively and physically disturbed in its possession ("turbação") or completely severed from it ("esbulho"). A possessor acting under the prescriptions of Article 1.210 of the Civil Code shall be exempt of any civil or criminal responsibility. In terms of Tort Law, Article 188, inc. I, of the Civil Code states that is not an unlawful act "the regular exercise of a right recognized by the law".

Canada
According to the Criminal Code of Canada Sections 34 and 35, (which were updated in 2012 with the passage of Bill C-26) force, up to and including lethal force may be used in defence of one's life or "peaceably" possessed property or the defence of another's life or "peaceably" possessed property, and is not considered an offence so long as the person believes that force is being used against them in the case of self-defence; that someone is about to, or has, broken into or damaged property in the case of defence of property; that they are acting in defence of themselves, someone else or "peaceably" possessed property, and that the act and degree of force is reasonable in the circumstances. The Criminal Code also lays out the factors in either case that will be used to determine what constitutes "reasonable given the circumstances". Additionally, case law in Canada has unambiguously held that the use of lethal force in defence of property alone is not reasonable. The changes made by the government were to clarify the laws involving self-defence and defence of property, and to help legal professionals to apply the law as believed to reflect the values Canadians hold to be acceptable.

England and Wales
In English common law a defendant may seek to avoid criminal or civil liability by claiming that he acted in self-defence. This requires the jury to determine whether the defendant believed that force was necessary to defend him or herself, their property, or to prevent a crime, and that the force used was reasonable. While there is no duty to retreat from an attacker and failure to do so is not conclusive evidence that a person did not act in self-defence, it may still be considered by the jury as a relevant factor when assessing the merits of a self-defence claim. The common law duty to retreat was repealed by the Criminal Law Act 1967. This duty never existed when a person is somewhere he has a lawful right to be, but due to the repeal, now extends to public places, etc.

Germany
German law allows self-defense against an unlawful attack, without any duty to retreat. Courts have interpreted this law as applicable to home invasion, including the use of lethal force against law enforcement in cases where the home owner was of the mistaken belief that the intrusion was an unlawful attack on his life.

Ireland
Under the terms of the Criminal Law (Defence and the Dwelling) Act 2011, property owners or residents are entitled to defend themselves with force, up to and including lethal force. Any individual who uses force against a trespasser is not guilty of an offense if he or she honestly believes that the intruder was there to commit a criminal act and posed a threat to life. However, there is a further provision which requires that the reaction to the intruder is such that another reasonable person in the same circumstances would likely employ. This provision acts as a safeguard against grossly disproportionate use of force, while still allowing a person to use force in nearly all circumstances.

The law was introduced in response to DPP v. Pádraig Nally. The Act largely places previous Irish common law jurisprudence regarding self-defense on a statutory footing.

Israel
Israeli law allows property owners to defend themselves with force. This law was introduced in response to the trial of Shai Dromi, an Israeli farmer who shot Arab intruders on his farm late at night in 2007.

Italy
Italy passed a law in 2005 that allowed property owners to defend themselves with force but required proof that the intruder posed an immediate physical threat. In 2019, the law was expanded to say that a property owner can protect their property with a firearm against perceived threats without fear of being prosecuted. The law also offers free legal aid and defence counsel costs for those who kill or injure an intruder.

Sweden
Swedish self defence law allows for defence of property (not only one's home) as well as persons. The force used in defence must not be obviously unproportional to that that is under threat. That is, deadly force can not be used in self defence unless the threat includes deadly force, for example against a simple theft. Sweden also has a citizen's arrest law that provides for arresting e.g. trespassers until police arrives.

See also
Duty to retreat, obligation to withdraw rather than attack, overridden by castle doctrine
Justifiable homicide, the blameless killing of a person, such as in self-defense.
Killing of Nathan Heidelberg, 2019 death of a Texas police officer; the homeowner who shot Heidelberg on his front porch, believing him to be an intruder, was acquitted of all charges
Stand-your-ground law, which applies the castle doctrine to any place.
Self-defence (Australia)
Semayne's case, 1604 case establishing the "knock-and-announce" rule in English common law, and where the "castle doctrine" phrasing comes from
Squatting in the United States
Trespasser

History
Claim club

Related sayings
a man's home is his castle
an Englishman's home is his castle

Notes

Criminal defenses
Homicide
U.S. state criminal law
Legal doctrines and principles
Self-defense
Gun politics in the United States